Barton and Pooley Bridge is a civil parish in Eden District, Cumbria, England. The parish is on the edge of the Lake District National Park, and had a population of 232 according to the 2001 census, increasing slightly to 238 at the 2011 Census. The parish includes the village of Pooley Bridge, the small hamlet of Barton, and part of Ullswater, and extends south as far as Loadpot Hill. The parish was renamed from "Barton" to "Barton and Pooley Bridge" on 1 April 2019.

The parish was once much bigger and included the present civil parishes of Patterdale, Yanwath and Eamont Bridge and Sockbridge and Tirril.

Etymology
Whaley suggests that 'Barton' is 'the barley farm or outlying grange', from OE 'beretūn' or, more probably, 'bærtūn', which was used of farms, especially outliers of large estates, used for storing crops." OE=Old English.

Governance
The parish has a parish council, the lowest tier of local government.

It is in the Askham ward of Eden District within the county of Cumbria, and the parliamentary constituency of Penrith and The Border, represented since 2019 by Neil Hudson (Conservative).

See also

 Listed buildings in Barton and Pooley Bridge

References

External links

   Cumbria County History Trust: Barton (nb: provisional research only – see Talk page)
Barton and Pooley Bridge Parish Council website

Civil parishes in Cumbria
Eden District